Atlanta is a major city in the United States and the capital of the state of Georgia.

Atlanta may also refer to:

Places

In the United States
 Atlanta, Arkansas, an unincorporated community
 Atlanta, California, an unincorporated community
 Atlanta, Delaware, an unincorporated community
 Atlanta, Idaho, an unincorporated community
 Atlanta, Illinois, a city
 Atlanta, Indiana, a town
 Atlanta, Kansas, a city
 Atlanta, Kentucky, an unincorporated community
 Atlanta, Louisiana, a village
 Atlanta, Michigan, an unincorporated community
 Atlanta, Mississippi, an unincorporated community
 Atlanta, Missouri, a city
 Atlanta, Nebraska, a village
 Camp Atlanta, an American World War II prisoner-of-war camp near the village
 Atlanta, New York, a hamlet
 Atlanta, Ohio, an unincorporated community
 Atlanta, Texas, a city
 Atlanta, Wisconsin, town
 Atlanta Township, Logan County, Illinois
 Atlanta Township, Rice County, Kansas
 Atlanta Township, Minnesota

Elsewhere
 Atlanta, Nova Scotia, Canada, a community
 Atlanta, South Caribbean Coast Autonomous Region, Nicaragua

Sports

Teams
 Based in Atlanta, Georgia:
 Atlanta Black Crackers, a Negro league baseball team in the early to mid-20th century
 Atlanta Braves, a Major League Baseball team
 Atlanta Chiefs, a soccer team in the National Professional Soccer League (1967) and the North American Soccer League (1968–1973 and 1979–1981)
 Atlanta Crackers, a minor league baseball team (1901–1965)
 Atlanta Dream, a Women's National Basketball Association team
 Atlanta Falcons, a National Football League team
 Atlanta Flames, a former National Hockey League team (1972–1980)
 Atlanta Glory, a women's basketball team in the American Basketball League (1996–1998), also a 2012 expansion team of the Women's American Basketball Association
 Atlanta Thrashers, a former National Hockey League team
 Atlanta Hawks, a National Basketball Association team
 Atlanta United, a Major League Soccer team
 Club Atlético Atlanta, a sports club in Buenos Aires, Argentina

Other sports
 Atlanta Open (tennis)
 Atlanta Classic, a former PGA golf tournament
 Atlanta Motor Speedway, Atlanta, Georgia

Military
 Battle of Atlanta, an 1864 American Civil War battle
 , various United States Navy ships, including one that also served in the Confederate States Navy as CSS Atlanta
 Atlanta-class cruiser, a United States Navy World War II class of light cruisers

Arts and entertainment

Music
 Atlanta (band), a country music band from Nashville, active since the 1980s (or their self-titled debut album)
 Atlanta (singer), Lithuanian pop singer Elena Puidokaitė (born 1981)
 Atlanta (Porcupine Tree album), 2010
 Atlanta (Evan Parker album), 1990
 "Atlanta," a song by Stone Temple Pilots from their 1999 album №4

Other arts and entertainment
 Atlanta (TV series) (2016–2022), an American comedy-drama television series
 Atlanta Shore, a character in Stingray TV series
 Atlanta Beanie Baby, a Beanie Baby bear produced by Ty, Inc. in 2004

Schools
 Atlanta Metropolitan State College, a public college in Atlanta, Georgia
 Clark Atlanta University, originally named Atlanta University, a private, Methodist, historically black research university in Atlanta, Georgia
 University of Atlanta, a defunct private, for-profit, distance education school which was headquartered in Atlanta, Georgia
 Georgia State University, one of the State of Georgia's largest public institutions headquartered in Atlanta, Georgia

Other uses
 Episcopal Diocese of Atlanta, Georgia
 Roman Catholic Archdiocese of Atlanta, Georgia
 United States Penitentiary, Atlanta, Georgia, a medium-security federal prison
 Atlanta (gastropod), a genus of sea snails
 Atlanta (magazine), a general-interest magazine based in Atlanta, Georgia
 Air Atlanta, an airline based in Atlanta, Georgia, United States, during the mid-1980s
 Call sign for Air Atlanta Icelandic
 Atlanta Centre, an office skyscraper in San Juan, Metro Manila, Philippines
 Radio Atlanta, a commercial station that operated briefly in 1964 from a ship anchored in the North Sea near England
 , a Great Lakes steamer that sank in 1906

See also
 Atlanta United FC, a Major League Soccer team based in Atlanta, Georgia
 Atalanta (disambiguation)
 Atlant (disambiguation)
 Atlante (disambiguation)
 Atalante (disambiguation)
 "Hot 'Lanta", an Allman Brothers song